The 2010 Florida Attorney General election took place on November 2, 2010, to elect the Attorney General of Florida. The election was won by Republican Pam Bondi who took office in January 2011.

Republican primary

Candidates
 Holly Benson, former state representative
 Pam Bondi,  former assistant state attorney
 Jeff Kottkamp, Lieutenant Governor of Florida

Campaign
With Governor Charlie Crist opting to run for the United States Senate in 2010 rather than seek re-election, Lieutenant Governor Jeff Kottkamp ran for attorney general. He was joined in the Republican primary by former state representative and Crist administration official Holly Benson and assistant state attorney Pam Bondi.

Though all three candidates were relatively unknown, Kottkamp had the greatest name recognition following his successful statewide campaign in 2006, and raised the most money. Kottkamp campaigned on his endorsements from law enforcement, his support for cracking down on pill mills, cybercrime, and Medicaid fraud, and his opposition to illegal immigration. He was criticized, however, for his use of state planes and vehicles to travel on vacations and to music concerts.

Benson, meanwhile, campaigned on her fiscal conservatism, pledging to create a "regulatory strike force" and to "focus legal efforts on cutting government regulation of businesses and unnecessary paperwork." She emphasized her experience running the state Department of Business and Professional Regulation and the state Agency for Health Care Administration. The Orlando Sentinel, though praising her "stronger management experience," called her priorities "misplaced," and observed that "reducing regulations on business and limiting lawsuits" were more appropriate goals for a governor or state legislator. Pam Bondi attacked Benson for remarking during a radio interview, "[J]ust because you're poor doesn't mean you have to be unhealthy. It means you have a lot more time to go running."

Finally, Bondi emphasized her conservative credentials and her opposition to the Obama administration. She noted that she would have refused to accept stimulus money from the federal government, took a position against the restoration of felons' voter rights, and pledged to challenge the Affordable Care Act in court.

Endorsements

Results

Democratic primary

Candidates
 Dave Aronberg, state senator
 Dan Gelber, state senator

Endorsements

Results

General election

Results

References

Attorney General
Florida
Florida Attorney General elections